Passage to Music is an album by American jazz saxophonist David S. Ware recorded in 1988 and released on the Swedish Silkheart label. Besides tenor sax Ware plays saxello, a variant of the soprano sax played by English jazz musician Elton Dean, and stritch, a straight alto sax associated with multi-instrumentalist Rahsaan Roland Kirk. The CD edition adds two bonus tracks.

Reception

In his review for AllMusic, Scott Yanow states "David Ware's searching improvisations reward repeated listenings by open-eared listeners."
The Penguin Guide to Jazz states "Passage To Music has something of Ayler's and Sander's Afro-mysticism and constitutes something of a personal initiation".

Track listing
All compositions by David S. Ware
 "An Ancient Formula" - 6:00 
 "Ancient Visitors" - 7:30 
 "Passage To Music"- 10:46 
 "African Secrets" - 10:47 
 "The Elders Path" - 13:20 
 "Phonetic Hymn" - 9:00 
 "Mystery" - 11:43 
6 & 7 does not appear on original LP

Personnel
David S. Ware - tenor sax, saxello, stritch
William Parker - bass
Marc Edwards - drums

References

1989 albums
David S. Ware albums
Silkheart Records albums